Sir Patrick Thomas McGrath,  (16 December 1868 – 14 June 1929) was a Newfoundland journalist and politician.

Born in St. John's, Newfoundland, the eldest son of William McGrath and Mary Bermingham, McGrath started working as a reporter for the St John’s Evening Herald in 1891. In 1893, he was interim editor of the Evening Herald and was appointed editor in 1894. From 1897 to 1900, he was the assistant clerk of the Newfoundland and Labrador House of Assembly and was appointed clerk in 1901. In 1912, he was appointed to the Legislative Council of Newfoundland. From 1915 to 1919 and from 1925 until his death, he was president of the council.

In 1918, he was made a Knight Commander of the Order of the British Empire for his contributions to the war effort.

References

External links

1868 births
1929 deaths
Knights Commander of the Order of the British Empire
Members of the Legislative Council of Newfoundland
People from St. John's, Newfoundland and Labrador
Dominion of Newfoundland politicians
Newfoundland Colony people